As Brasileiras (The Brazilians - The Women) is a Brazilian television series co-produced by Rede Globo and Lereby Productions. The series aired on Rede Globo from 2 February 2012 to 28 June 2012. The series is a spin-off of As Cariocas. Each episode has a separate storyline, all located in different Brazilian states.

Premise 
The series features a cast of 22 actresses representing Brazil's female diversity, such as Juliana Paes, Giovanna Antonelli, Gloria Pires, Fernanda Montenegro. The series features powerful, fragile, funny, protective, beautiful, talented and insightful women.

Notable cast members 

 Juliana Paes
 Marcos Palmeira
 Leona Cavalli
 Cláudia Jimenez
 Edson Celulari
 Suyane Moreira
 Danton Mello
 Patrícia Pillar
 Marcello Antony
 Malu Galli
 Leandra Leal
 Fábio Assunção
 Ivete Sangalo
 Ísis Valverde
 Xuxa Meneghel
 Bianca Byington
 Giulia Gam
 Rodrigo Lombardi
 Werner Schünemann
 Christine Fernandes
 Alice Braga
 Rodrigo Santoro
 Babu Santana
 Maria Fernanda Cândido
 Letícia Sabatella
 Camila Morgado
 Caco Ciocler
 Giovanna Antonelli
 Vivianne Pasmanter
 Sandy
 Fernanda Paes Leme
 Juliana Alves
 Mariana Ximenes
 Guilherme Fontes
 Glória Pires
 Nicette Bruno
 Tony Ramos
 Maria Flor
 Bruna Linzmeyer
 Mateus Solano
 Cléo Pires
 Bruno Gagliasso
 Sophie Charlotte
 Malvino Salvador
 Cris Vianna
 Priscila Fantin
 Dira Paes
 Dalton Vigh
 Betty Faria
 Fernanda Montenegro
 Paulo José

Episodes

Ratings

References

External links
 

Rede Globo original programming
2012 Brazilian television series debuts
Brazilian television series
Brazilian anthology television series
Portuguese-language television shows
Television shows set in Curitiba
Television shows set in Porto Alegre
Television shows set in Rio de Janeiro (city)
Television shows set in Salvador
Television shows set in São Paulo
Television shows set in Amazonas (Brazilian state)
2012 in Brazilian television